PBV may refer to:

Transportation and vehicles
 St. George Airport (Alaska) (FAA airport code: PBV), St. George, St. George Island, Aleutians West, Aleutian Islands, Alaska, USA
 Porto dos Gaúchos Airport (IATA airport code: PBV); see List of airports by IATA airport code: P
 Pbv, a prefix code for armored combat vehicles; see List of modern armoured fighting vehicles
 PBV, a model prefix used by Canadian Vickers

 post-boost vehicle, a component of a ballistic missile

Groups, companies, and, organizations
 Peace Boat Disaster Relief Volunteer Centre (PBV)
 Pacific Baseball Ventures (PBV), the organization for creating the baseball team Yakima Valley Pippins
 Publishing and Broadcasting Video (PBV), former name of Communications and Entertainment Limited

Voting systems 
 Party block voting (also known as the 'general ticket')
 Preferential block voting

Other uses
 Pnar language (ISO 639 language code: pbv)
 price-to-book-value ratio (P/BV), a type of financial ratio

See also

 Canadian Vickers PBV-1 Canso flying boat
 CYTH2 (aka 1PBV), the cytohesin-2 gene